Evan Gwyndaf Evans or "Gwyndaf" (6 March 1913 – 10 March 1986) was a Welsh poet who served as Archdruid of the National Eisteddfod of Wales from 1966 to 1969.

Gwyndaf came from Llanfachreth, Gwynedd. He was minister of Tabernacle Chapel, Llanelli, from 1935 until 1957, and taught Scripture at Ysgol Brynrefail, Llanrug from 1957 until 1978.

Like all Archdruids, Gwyndaf was a former winner of a major prize at the National Eisteddfod. He won the Chair at the Caernarfon Eisteddfod of 1935 with his poem Magdalen, the first time a poem in vers libre, combined with the traditional cynghanedd, had won the competition.

Legacy
The Chair won by Gwyndaf at the 1935 Eisteddfod was presented by Welsh expatriates in New Zealand. After the death of Gwyndaf's wife, it was left to the National Library of Wales, along with his portrait.

Works
 Magdalen a cherddi eraill (Gwasg Gomer, 1962)
 Cerddi Gwyndaf: y casgliad cyflawn (Denbigh: Gwasg Gee, 1987 )

References 

1913 births
1986 deaths
Chaired bards
Welsh Eisteddfod archdruids
People from Gwynedd
Welsh-language poets